Hanfstaengl (or Hanfstängl) is a German surname, meaning "hemp stalk". Notable people with the surname include:

Franz Hanfstaengl (1804–1877), German painter, lithographer, and photographer; father of Edgar
Edgar Hanfstaengl (1842–1910), son of Franz; art publisher and father of Erna and Ernst
Marie Hanfstängl (1848–1917), German soprano
Erna Hanfstaengl (1885–1981), daughter of Edgar, sister of Ernst, and confidant of Adolf Hitler and Unity Mitford
Ernst Hanfstaengl (1887–1975), son of Edgar, brother of Erna, and confidant of Adolf Hitler and Franklin Delano Roosevelt

German-language surnames